Five merchant ships have been named SS William H. Gratwick.

 SS William H. Gratwick (1880), U.S. propeller, steam barge, Official No. 80777.
 SS William H. Gratwick (1882), U.S. propeller-tugboat, Official No. 80879.
 SS William H. Gratwick (1887), also known as Fleetwood, U.S. propeller, Official No. 81145.
Official No.126660.
 SS William H. Gratwick (1902), also known as Pegasus, U.S. propeller, Official No. 81801.

References

Ship names